Cora pseudocorani is a species of basidiolichen in the family Hygrophoraceae. Found in Bolivia, it was formally described as a new species in 2016 by Robert Lücking  Eduardo Morales, and Manuela Dal Forno. The specific epithet pseudocorani refers to its resemblance to Cora corani, another terrestrial species found at the same location. Cora pseudocorani is only known to occur at the type locality, the Corani Lake reservoir in Chapare Province, Cochabamba. Here the lichen grows on the ground over bryophytes.

References

pseudocorani
Lichen species
Lichens described in 2016
Lichens of Central America
Taxa named by Robert Lücking
Basidiolichens